The Ghost Breaker is a 1922 American silent horror comedy film about haunted houses and ghosts. It was produced by Famous Players-Lasky and distributed through Paramount Pictures. It was directed by Alfred E. Green and starred Wallace Reid in one of his last screen roles. The story, based on the 1909 play The Ghost Breaker by Paul Dickey and Charles W. Goddard, had been released on film in 1914 (bearing the same name), directed by Cecil B. DeMille and Oscar Apfel.

The 1922 version is now considered lost. Two of the actors in this film, Snitz Edwards and Arthur Edmund Carewe, later appeared together in the 1925 Lon Chaney silent classic The Phantom of the Opera. Two uncredited "ghosts" in the cast, Mervyn LeRoy and Richard Arlen, later went on to successful film careers.

The Ghost Breaker would be remade in the sound era as The Ghost Breakers (1940) with Bob Hope and Paulette Goddard, and later as Scared Stiff (1953) starring Jerry Lewis and Dean Martin.

Plot
Warren Jarvis and his manservant Rusty Snow help a beautiful young heiress named Maria Theresa to rid her father's mansion of ghosts. The spooks turn out to be fakes however, fabricated by the Duke D'Alba to scare the young lady away, thus allowing him to steal her father's hidden gold.

Cast
Wallace Reid as Warren (Walter) Jarvis, ghost breaker
Lila Lee as Maria Theresa, a Spanish heiress
Walter Hiers (in blackface) as Rusty Snow, a Negro servant
Arthur Edmund Carewe as Duke D'Alba, leader of the ghosts
J. Farrell MacDonald as Sam Marcum, a Kentucky feudist
Frances Raymond as Aunt Mary Jarvis
Snitz Edwards as Maurice
Richard Arlen as A Ghost (uncredited)
Mervyn LeRoy as A Ghost (uncredited)
George O'Brien as A Ghost (uncredited)

See also
List of lost films
Wallace Reid filmography

References

External links

The Ghost Breaker at silentera.com
Surviving image card
Surviving Wallace Reid image from lost film "The Ghost Breaker"(Wayback Machine)
lantern slide

1922 films
1920s comedy horror films
1922 horror films
American comedy horror films
American silent feature films
Famous Players-Lasky films
American films based on plays
Films directed by Alfred E. Green
American black-and-white films
American haunted house films
Lost horror films
Paramount Pictures films
Lost American films
1922 comedy films
1920s English-language films
1920s American films
Silent comedy-drama films
Silent comedy horror films
Silent American drama films
Silent American comedy films